Divisiones Regionales de Fútbol in La Rioja, includes only the Regional Preferente.

League chronology
Timeline

Regional Preferente

Regional Preferente is the fifth category of football in La Rioja. It is organized by the Federación Riojana de Fútbol.

Regional Preferente consist in 17 teams. At the end of the season, the top three teams are promoted. There are no relegations.

2019–20 season teams

Champions

External links 
 La Regional Preferente riojana en Gol RIOJA - golrioja.com
Federación Riojana de Fútbol
Futbolme.com

Divisiones regionales de fútbol
Football in La Rioja (Spain)